River Bend may refer to:
 River Bend, North Carolina
 River Bend, Missouri
 River Bend, South Africa
 River Bend Nuclear Generating Station, located 24 miles NNW of Baton Rouge, Louisiana, owned and operated by Entergy Corporation
 River Bend (Illinois)
 River Bend, West Virginia

See also
Riverbend (disambiguation)